Amancio Williams (February 19, 1913 –October 14, 1989) was an Argentine architect and among his country's leading exponents of modern architecture.

Life and work

Amancio Williams was born in Buenos Aires in 1913. His father, Alberto Williams, was a well-known composer of chamber music and the founder of the Buenos Aires Music Conservatory. He enrolled at the School of Engineering of the University of Buenos Aires, though an interest in aviation led him to leave school during his third year. This sabbatical ended in 1938, when he enrolled at the same university's School of Architecture.

He graduated in 1941 and created a portfolio of numerous prospective designs, though he found buyers for only a few, and among these was a residence in Mar del Plata commissioned by his own father. The elder Williams had purchased a 2-hectare (5 acre) property in what were then the wooded outskirts of the seaside city. A stream running through the land became the centerpiece for the architect's 1942 design for a modern, 9 by 27 meter (30 by 90 foot) weatherized concrete structure, which was set on an archway straddling the stream.

Williams also designed the home's minimalist interiors, fashioning the interior doors, fixtures and boiserie in a nearby workshop, as well most of the furniture. The concrete used in its construction was also chemically weatherized at the facility, so done to allow its use in the design without the need for cladding, which Williams felt would take from the "honesty of the materials." Christened the Casa del Puente ("Bridge House") upon its completion in 1946, it served as composer Alberto Williams' home until his death in 1952.

His design proposals in 1945 for a new international airport, to be built on the Río de la Plata and connected to the city via causeway, were rejected in favor of what became Ministro Pistarini International Airport, and aside from three Corrientes Province hospitals, he would complete no significant government works in subsequent decades. He was assigned by Le Corbusier, however, to supervise construction for the Curutchet House, a residence designed in 1949 by the Swiss architect for Dr. Pedro Curutchet, a prominent La Plata physician.

He was invited to display his ideas on acoustics at La Sorbonne, and the Dean of the Harvard Graduate School of Design, Walter Gropius, organized exhibits of his works in 1951 and 1955, on which latter occasion Williams was a guest lecturer. During the 1950s, he developed designs based on what he called hollow vaults. These were concrete pillars that, by their design, could drain rainwater while supporting the building above as stilts. He later employed the concept for the 1966 Bunge y Born exhibit at the La Rural Exposition grounds and in 1968 for the German Embassy, both in Buenos Aires, as well as for a monument to the reconstruction of Berlin.

Williams was inducted into the American Institute of Architects as an honorary member in 1962. After 1974, he worked on "the city humanity needs," a plan for an above-ground metropolis supported by his hollow vaults for the purpose of reducing land use. He was also contracted by the Argentine government to design a self-contained city planned for Argentine Antarctica, though his design, presented in 1980, was never carried out. Williams died in Buenos Aires in 1989 at age 76.

A temporary structure used in 1966 as part of the La Rural expo grounds was revived by one of his sons, Claudio, and was included as a centerpiece of a waterfront park inaugurated in 1999 in the Buenos Aires suburb of Vicente López as the Monument to the End of the Millennium. The Bridge House which was home to a sister of Williams' until her death in 1966, was purchased by a Mar del Plata radio station, but ultimately returned to the architect. He maintained it until his death in 1989, and it was declared a National Historic Monument in 1997. This failed to secure it adequate funding for its maintenance, however, and the historic property was ultimately abandoned and gutted by fire in September 2004. Works to restore the landmark were initiated by the national government in 2007.

References

University of Buenos Aires alumni
University of Paris people
Argentine people of Irish descent
People from Buenos Aires
1913 births
1989 deaths
20th-century Argentine architects
Burials at La Recoleta Cemetery